Dunadry is a hamlet and townland (of 657 acres) 3 miles (5 km) from Antrim in County Antrim, Northern Ireland. It is situated in the civil parish of Grange of Nilteen and the historic barony of Antrim Upper. It is within the Antrim and Newtownabbey Borough Council area. It had a population of 430 people (190 households) in the 2011 Census. (2001 Census: 237 people).

History
Around 1251 the name of Dunadry townland was recorded as Dunedergel. The Irish Dún Eadradh may reinterpret an earlier name, Dún Eadarghabhal (fort between forks), referring to a fort which formerly stood in the junction between the Six Mile Water River and the Rathmore Burn. The 1838 Ordnance Survey Memoir records Dunadry as taking its name from a fort which stood about 100 yards to the north of the village.

The site of an ancient church and graveyard, formerly the parish church of the Grange of Nilteen, lies in the townland. In the Papal Taxation c.1306 the church is recorded as Ecclesia de Drumnedergal. The Ordnance Survey Memoir of 1838 records, however, that the foundations of the church were wholly removed and the burial ground cultivated.

Transport
Dunadry railway station was opened on 11 April 1848 but closed on 20 September 1954.

See also
List of towns and villages in Northern Ireland
List of townlands in County Antrim

References

Villages in County Antrim
Civil parish of Grange of Nilteen